Red Moon in Venus is the third studio album by Colombian American singer Kali Uchis. The album was released on March 3, 2023, through Interscope Records. The album features guest appearances by Omar Apollo, Don Toliver and Summer Walker. It is predominantly an R&B record.

Red Moon in Venus debuted at #4 on the Billboard 200 and at #2 on Billboard's Top R&B/Hip-Hop Albums, making it her first top 10 album on that list.

Background 
On January 11, 2022, Uchis announced that she was putting the finishing touches on her third studio album. On April 21, 2022, she revealed to Billboard that she had two albums ready, one in English and one in Spanish. On September 2, 2022, Uchis released the "retro house" track "No Hay Ley", the first solo release in nearly two years. On December 9, 2022, she announced that she had turned in the new album, describing it as her "latest contribution to this world". She released the single "I Wish You Roses" on January 19, 2023, along with its music video. The song was produced by Dylan Wiggins and Josh Crocker. According to Uchis, the song is about "being able to release people with love". On February 23, 2023, she released the second single for the album, "Moonlight", accompanied by a lyric video.

The singer announced the album title three days later. Uchis revealed through her Instagram stories that many of the songs on the album were written and recorded years ago, specifying that the album was recorded during lockdown. The release date and the cover were both revealed on January 23. About the project, Uchis explained:

She felt inspired by astrology, wanting to reflect the blood moon as the trigger to "send your emotions into a spin".

Critical reception 

Red Moon in Venus received widespread acclaim from critics. At Metacritic, which assigns a normalized rating out of 100 to reviews from mainstream publications, the album received an average score of 85, based on 12 reviews, indicating "universal acclaim". Aggregator AnyDecentMusic? gave it 7.7 out of 10, based on their assessment of the critical consensus. The album received an 8.2 out of 10 on Pitchfork and was acclaimed as "best new music" the week of its release.

Track listing

Personnel 
Musicians
 Kali Uchis – vocals
 Phil Cornish – piano (track 1)
 Josh Crocker – bass guitar, drums, keyboards, programming (2, 4, 12); guitar (2, 4)
 Vicky Nguyen – keyboards (3)
 Rocco Palladino – bass guitar (12)
 Alexander Bourt – percussion (12)
 Elijah Fox – piano (12)
 Malik Venner – saxophone (12)
 Miles James – synthesizer (12)
 Nick Movshon – bass guitar (14)
 Homer Steinweiss – drums (14)
 Paul Castelluzo – guitar (14)
 Benny Blanco – keyboards, programming (14)
 Magnus Høiberg – keyboards, programming (14)
 Leon Michels – keyboards (14)

Technical
 Prash Mistry – mastering (all tracks), mixing (5–10, 13–15)
 David Kim – mixing (1–4, 11, 12)
 Benny Blanco – mixing (14)
 Cashmere Cat – mixing (14)
 Austen Jux-Chandler – engineering
 Morning Estrada – engineering (2–10, 13)
 Hector Castro – engineering (3, 7, 8, 12)
 Miguel Correa – engineering (7, 8)
 Jens Jungkurth – engineering (14)
 Leon Michels – engineering (14)
 Luca Brown – engineering assistance (5)

Charts

Release history

References

2023 albums
Kali Uchis albums
Interscope Records albums